Claude François Ferey, Baron de Rozengath (21 September 1771 – 24 July 1812) was a French division commander during the Napoleonic Wars. At the end of the Battle of Salamanca his division held off the victorious Anglo-Portuguese forces, while the rest of the army escaped. He was killed in this action.

His surname is one of the Names inscribed under the Arc de Triomphe, on Column 38.

Career
In 1787 he joined the French Royal Army and became an officer in 1792. During the French Revolutionary Wars he fought at Mainz and in the Vendée. Appointed commander of the 24th Light Infantry Demi-Brigade in 1796, he led his unit at Neuwied, Montebello, and Marengo.

Promoted to general of brigade in 1803, he led a brigade at Austerlitz, Jena, Lübeck, Bergfried, Eylau, Lomitten, and Heilsberg. Posted to Spain, he led his brigade at Bussaco and Casal Novo. After being promoted to general of division, he commanded his division at Fuentes de Onoro.

At the Battle of Salamanca on 22 July 1812, Ferey commanded the 3rd Division of the Army of Portugal, with 5,689 men in nine battalions and attached artillery. The 3rd Division was composed of three battalions of the 47th Line Infantry Regiment and two battalions each of the 31st Light, 26th Line, and 70th Line Infantry Regiments. Marshal Auguste Marmont attempted to turn the right flank of the Anglo-Portuguese army by marching his left flank divisions to the west. When the French divisions became too widely extended, Arthur Wellesley, Earl of Wellington attacked them. The left flank divisions of Jean Guillaume Barthélemy Thomières and Antoine Louis Popon de Maucune were quickly routed. Next, British heavy dragoons broke Antoine François Brenier de Montmorand's division. While these events were going on, Marmont and his ranking division commander Jean Pierre François Bonet were both wounded by bursting shells, leaving Bertrand Clauzel in command of the army. Meanwhile, the divisions of Clausel and Bonet pushed back Lowry Cole's 4th Anglo-Portuguese division. Clausel sent Jacques Thomas Sarrut's division to assist his mauled left flank and tried to exploit the success in the center. But Wellington rapidly brought up the 5th Division which defeated the two attacking French divisions.

With the beaten French army streaming to the rear, Ferey's division appeared on the scene. Ferey deployed seven battalions in three-deep lines with his remaining two battalions in square covering each flank. A short distance behind his line was the Pelagarcia Wood. The initial attack of Henry Clinton's Anglo-Portuguese division was brought to a halt and a terrific musketry duel began. At length, Ferey's men backed up to the skirts of the forest. Clinton brought up his Portuguese brigade from the second line, but these men could not stand the fire and fell back. By now the French ranks were being raked by artillery fire. As Clinton sent forward his British troops, pressure from James Leith's division finally collapsed Ferey's left flank. The wreckage of his division managed a fighting retreat through the woods until joined by Maximilien Sébastien Foy's division. Ferey was mortally wounded and 1,000 of his troops became casualties during the fighting.

A different Claude François Ferey, born on 22 December 1723, attained the rank of general of brigade on 25 August 1793, and died on 6 January 1806.

Notes

References

 

French generals
French military personnel of the French Revolutionary Wars
Military personnel of the War in the Vendée
French military personnel killed in the Napoleonic Wars
French commanders of the Napoleonic Wars
People from Haute-Saône
1771 births
1812 deaths
Names inscribed under the Arc de Triomphe